The Girlfriend of a Big Man is a 1934 German comedy film directed by Paul Wegener and starring Käthe von Nagy, Karl Ludwig Diehl and Jessie Vihrog.

The film's sets were designed by the art director Erich Kettelhut and Max Mellin.

Cast
Käthe von Nagy as Marga Köhler
Karl Ludwig Diehl as Peters
Jessie Vihrog as Sigrid Mansfeld
Hans Brausewetter as Ullrich
Harry Frank as Willrodt
Ernst Behmer as Gärtner
Theodor Loos as Dr. Nordegg
Ernst Legal as curtain puller
Gustav Püttjer as stage master
Hans Zesch-Ballot as Hollberg
Werner Finck as Banz
Hans Leibelt as Rieder, the banker

References

External links

German comedy films
1934 comedy films
Films directed by Paul Wegener
Films of Nazi Germany
UFA GmbH films
German black-and-white films
1930s German films
1930s German-language films